Riverside Plaza is a  outdoor mall in Riverside, California originally anchored by a  Harris Company (later Harris’/Gottschalks) department store along with Montgomery Ward. It was the city's first mall and was originally an outdoor mall and then remodeled to an enclosed indoor mall then again remodeled to an outdoor mall. 

After a $12-million renovation in the early 2010s, the center features walkways, fountains, decorative lights and courtyard seats. Today it is anchored by a Regal Cinemas, Forever 21, Trader Joe's, Marshalls, JoAnn Fabrics & Crafts and Nordstrom Rack. 

Forever 21 opened first in the empty Harris’/Gottschalks building space, but relocated in 2013 to a space that Borders Books vacated.

References

Shopping malls in Riverside County, California
Buildings and structures in Riverside, California
Power centers (retail) in the United States